Utricularia fulva is a small to medium-sized annual carnivorous plant that belongs to the genus Utricularia. U. fulva is endemic to Australia, where it appears to be largely restricted to the Northern Territory, specifically the Arnhem Land sandstone escarpment. It grows as a terrestrial or subaquatic plant in or near sandy stream beds. It was originally described and published by Ferdinand von Mueller in 1858.

See also 
 List of Utricularia species

References

External links 

Carnivorous plants of Australia
Flora of the Northern Territory
fulva
Lamiales of Australia
Taxa named by Ferdinand von Mueller